The 2007–08 Czech 1.liga season was the 15th season of the Czech 1.liga, the second level of ice hockey in the Czech Republic. 16 teams participated in the league, and BK Mlada Boleslav won the championship.

First round

Western Group

Eastern Group

Pre-Playoffs 
 HC Hradec Králové – SK Horácká Slavia Třebíč 3:2 (2:3, 10:0, 1:3, 4:1, 7:2)
 HC Vrchlabí – HC Dukla Jihlava 3:2 (3:1, 4:3, 2:7, 1:2, 1:0)
 HC Havířov – HC Rebel Havlíčkův Brod 1:3 (2:3 n.V., 1:2 n.V., 2:1, 2:5)
 HC Sareza Ostrava – SK Kadaň 3:0 (3:1, 4:2, 4:0)

Playoffs

Quarterfinals 
 BK Mladá Boleslav – HC Rebel Havlíčkův Brod 4:0 (4:1, 6:5 P, 3:2 P, 4:3)
 HC Olomouc – HC Sareza Ostrava 4:1 (6:2, 7:3, 4:6, 3:2 P, 7:4)
 KLH Chomutov – HC Vrchlabí 4:1 (3:1, 4:1, 0:5, 4:2, 7:3)
 HC Kometa Brno – HC Hradec Králové 4:2 (2:1 P, 1:2, 3:1, 1:6, 6:5 P, 3:2)

Semifinals
 BK Mladá Boleslav – HC Kometa Brno 4:3 (4:2, 4:3, 0:4, 0:3, 6:3, 1:6, 2:1 P)
 HC Olomouc – KLH Chomutov 2:4 (5:2, 7:6 SN, 1:4, 0:2, 2:3, 0:7)

Finals
 BK Mladá Boleslav – KLH Chomutov 4:0 ( 2:1 SN, 4:1, 6:5 SN, 3:2 )

Qualification round

External links
 Season on hockeyarchives.info

2007–08 in Czech ice hockey
Czech
Czech 1. Liga seasons